Lindy is a unisex given name and a nickname. As a female given name, it is a variant of names like Linda, Belinda, and Melinda, and the meaning of Lindy is "beautiful; pretty; sweet." As a male name, it is a variant of names such as Lindsay and Lyndon, and the meaning is "linden tree mountain; Lincoln's marsh; island of linden trees; linden tree hill."

Lindy was most popular in the year 1979, when it ranked 586th.

People

Given name

Women
 Lindy Booth (born 1979), Canadian actress
 Lyndy or Lindy Brill (born 1963), British actress and singer
 Lindy Burns, Australian presenter
 Lindy Davies (born 1946), Australian actress, director and drama teacher
 Lindy DeKoven, American television executive
 Lindy Elkins-Tanton, American planetary scientist
Lindy Hamilton-Temple-Blackwood ( 1941–2020), British artist, conservationist and businesswoman
 Lindy Hemming (born 1948), Welsh Oscar-winning costume designer
 Lindy Hou (born 1960), Australian tandem cyclist and triathlete
 Lindy Kelly (born 1952), New Zealand writer
 Lindy Leveau-Agricole (born 1978), Seychellois javelin thrower
 Lindy Robbins, American songwriter
 Lindy Rodwell (born 1962), South African zoologist and conservationist
 Lindy Vivas, American former volleyball player and coach
 Lindy Vopnfjörð (born 1972), Canadian singer-songwriter
 Lindy West (born 1982), American writer, feminist and editor
 Lindy Melissa Wiik (born 1985), Norwegian footballer
 Lindy Wilson, South African politician

Men
 Lindy Berry (1927-2014), American college football and Canadian Football League quarterback
 Lindy Fralin, American guitar pickup manufacturer
 Lindy Kasperski (1950–2014), Canadian politician
 Lindy Miller (born 1956), American professional golfer
 Lindy Pearson (born 1929), American National Football League player
 Lindy Remigino (1931–2018), American sprinter, 1952 Olympic 100 m champion
 Lindy Ruff (born 1960), Canadian National Hockey League coach and former player

Nickname

Women
 Lindy Boggs (1916–2013), American politician
 Lindy Chamberlain-Creighton (born 1948), Australian wrongly convicted of murdering her daughter
 Lindy Cochran (born 1953), American alpine skier
 Lindy Jenkins (born 1959), a justice with the Supreme Court of Western Australia appointed in 2004
 Lindy Layton (born 1970), British singer
 Lindy Morrison (born 1951), Australian rock drummer
 Lindy Nelson-Carr (born 1952), Australian former politician

Men
 Lindy Delapenha (1927–2017), Jamaican footballer and sports journalist
 Lindy Hood (1907–1972), American college basketball player
 Lindy Infante (born 1940), American football player and coach
 Lindy McDaniel (1935–2020), American Major League Baseball relief pitcher
 Lucky Lindy Charles Lindbergh (1902-1974) American aviator, military officer, author, inventor, and activist

Fictional characters
 Lindy, from Alex Flinn's novel Beastly and the film of the same name
 Lindy Karsten, from CrossGen Entertainment's Sigilverse
 Lindy, a fairy character from Noddy in Toyland
 Lindy Sampson, the protagonist in R. L. Stine's novel Eye Candy and main character in the hit MTV television series Eye Candy
 Lindy Watson, from Disney Channel's I Didn't Do It

References

Given names
Unisex given names
English-language unisex given names
English feminine given names
Lists of people by nickname